Chalybea kirkbridei is a species of plant in the family Melastomataceae. It is endemic to Sierra Nevada de Santa Marta in Colombia.

References

kirkbridei
Endangered plants
Endemic flora of Colombia
Taxonomy articles created by Polbot